Love Sick is the third studio album by American rapper Don Toliver. It was released on February 24, 2023, through Cactus Jack, and Atlantic Records. The production of the album was handled by multiple producers, including Boi-1da, James Blake, OZ, and Wheezy among others. The album also features guest appearances from Blake, GloRilla, Kali Uchis, Lil Durk, TisaKorean, Justin Bieber, Future, Wizkid, Charlie Wilson, Brent Faiyaz, and Toro y Moi. The deluxe version of the album was released on February 28, 2023, including additional guest appearences from Travis Scott and Teezo Touchdown.

Background and promotion 
In April 2022, Don Toliver cryptically revealed the album's title on a tweet. He described the album as “futuristic r&b and soul” and confirmed that his partner, Kali Uchis would be on it. In February 2023, Toliver continued teasing the project by posting an Instagram story of a whiteboard with the album's title. On February 24, he revealed the album's release date, track list and cover art.

Singles 
Three singles preceded the release of the album. The lead single, "Do It Right", was released on November 18, 2022. The second single, "4 Me", featuring Toliver's girlfriend, Colombian-American singer Kali Uchis, was released on February 15, 2023, as a Valentine's Day special. The album's third single "Leave the Club" featuring GloRilla and Lil Durk was released on February 17, 2023.

Critical reception

Clashs Robin Murray writes that Love Sick "often thrills when Don is left on his own" and that Don uses "flows that blur the lines between rap and R&B." Murray's review was concluded as he noted that "amid the glitz, the hype, the online intrusion, Don Toliver still locates a space to call his own – and that's what makes 'Love Sick' so thrilling."

Track listing

Personnel
Performers
 Don Toliver – vocals
 James Blake – vocals (2)
 Lil Durk – vocals (3)
 GloRilla – vocals (3)
 Kali Uchis – vocals (4)
 TisaKorean – vocals (5)
 Justin Bieber – vocals (9)
 Future – vocals (9)
 Wizkid – vocals (10)
 Charlie Wilson – vocals (12)
 Brent Faiyaz – vocals (14)
 Toro y Moi – vocals (15)

Technical
 Joe LaPorta – mastering
 Derek "206derek" Anderson – mixing, engineering
 Jaycen Joshua – mixing
 Austin Jux Chandler – engineering (4)
 Ryan Mellow – engineering (9)
 Leandro "Dro" Higaldo – engineering (10)
 Jimmy Cash – engineering (13)
 Damon Riggins Jr. – mixing assistance
 Jacob Richards – mixing assistance
 Mike Seaberg – mixing assistance
 Rachael Blum – mixing assistance
 Jonathan Lopez – engineering assistance (1, 3, 10, 15)
 Hayden Duncan – engineering assistance (2)
 Dominic Vicario – engineering assistance (9)
 Justin "Jusvibes" Gibson – additional vocal recording (3)
 Eric Manco – additional vocals recording (9)
 Josh Gudwin – additional vocal recording (9)
 Itai Schwartz – additional vocal recording (14)

Charts

References

 

2023 albums
Don Toliver albums

Albums produced by Allen Ritter
Albums produced by Boi-1da
Albums produced by Cardo (record producer)
Albums produced by DJ Dahi
Albums produced by Hit-Boy
Albums produced by James Blake (musician)
Albums produced by Kaytranada
Albums produced by Rodaidh McDonald
Albums produced by Ronny J
Albums produced by Wheezy
Atlantic Records albums
Soul albums by American artists